East Lothian Community Hospital is a hospital located on Station Road, Haddington, East Lothian, Scotland. The hospital is operated by NHS Lothian.

History
The Roodlands General Hospital was built as an infectious diseases hospital for the local area and opened around 1906. It became the County Infectious Diseases Hospital in 1930 and joined the National Health Service as Roodlands General Hospital in 1948.

A major redevelopment of the site to create a modern community hospital, known as East Lothian Community Hospital, was undertaken by Morrison Construction at a cost of £70 million, starting in January 2017. The new East Lothian Community Hospital opened in October 2020.

References 

Buildings and structures in East Lothian
NHS Scotland hospitals
NHS Lothian
Haddington, East Lothian